Thonon Agglomération is the communauté d'agglomération, an intercommunal structure, centred on the city of Thonon-les-Bains. It is located in the Haute-Savoie department, in the Auvergne-Rhône-Alpes region, eastern France. Created in 2017, its seat is in Thonon-les-Bains. Its area is 238.9 km2. Its population was 90,531 in 2019, of which 35,826 in Thonon-les-Bains proper.

Composition
The communauté d'agglomération consists of the following 25 communes:

Allinges
Anthy-sur-Léman
Armoy
Ballaison
Bons-en-Chablais
Brenthonne
Cervens
Chens-sur-Léman
Douvaine
Draillant
Excenevex
Fessy
Loisin
Lully
Lyaud
Margencel
Massongy
Messery
Nernier
Orcier
Perrignier
Sciez
Thonon-les-Bains
Veigy-Foncenex
Yvoire

References

Thonon
Thonon